Delia Austrian (September 18, 1874 – October 26, 1928) was an American journalist. The Delia Austrian Medal is awarded each year by the Drama League of New York in her honor.

Biography
She was born on September 18, 1874, in Cleveland, Ohio to Solomon Austrian and Julia Rebecca Mann (1848–1933). Her father was a Harvard University graduate and a lawyer. She had a twin sister, Celia Austrian (1874–1900) who died in Chicago, Illinois and two brothers, Alfred S. Austrian (1870–1932) and Harvey E. Austrian (1879–?). Delia wrote: "I was born into a good, middle-class family and had a happy childhood in Cleveland, . . . but later moved to Chicago, where my girlhood was spent."

In 1898 Delia graduated from the University of Chicago with a Bachelor of Philosophy degree. After her graduation she worked on the editorial staff of the Chicago Tribune. She received a master's degree from Columbia University in 1923.

Delia died on October 26, 1928, in Manhattan.

Legacy
Her papers were archived at the University of Chicago. The Delia Austrian Medal is awarded each year by the Drama League of New York for the most distinguished performance of the theater season.

Bibliography
 The American woman in art (1901)
 Love Songs (1902)
 Correspondences with Theodore Dreiser (1906) 
 Ways of War and Peace (1914)
 Juliette Recamier by Delia Austrian (1922)
 The Feminist Movement in Modern Drama (1924)

References

1874 births
1928 deaths
American women journalists
Chicago Tribune people
University of Chicago alumni
Columbia University alumni
Writers from Cleveland
Writers from Chicago
Journalists from Ohio
Journalists from Illinois
20th-century American non-fiction writers
20th-century American women writers